Dejan Bulatović (born 8 February 1975) is a Serbian politician and activist serving as the member of the National Assembly since 1 August 2022. 

He received international attention during the 1996–1997 protests in Serbia after he was arrested for carrying a puppet of Slobodan Milošević dressed in prison garb; subsequent reports that he was beaten by state authorities were covered in major newspapers worldwide. 

Bulatović later became an elected official in his home community of Šid and led the party, "Green Ecological Party – The Greens" (Zelena ekološka partija – Zeleni, ZEP–Zeleni). He was a vice-president of the Party of Freedom and Justice (Stranka slobode i pravde, SSP) until his departure from the party in December 2022.

Early life and private career
Bulatović was born in Šid, in what was then the Socialist Autonomous Province of Vojvodina in the Socialist Republic of Serbia, Socialist Federal Republic of Yugoslavia. During the 1996 protests, he was identified as a student and a factory worker. He is now active in agriculture and goat and sheep breeding.

Political career

1990s–2000s 
Bulatović joined the Serbian Renewal Movement (Srpski pokret obnove, SPO) in the 1990s and took part in the protests against electoral fraud that followed the 1996 local elections. At a Belgrade protest on 7 December 1996, he was one of a number of students who carried an effigy of authoritarian Serbian president Slobodan Milošević wearing prison clothes and a ball and chain. For this, he was arrested on charges of creating a public disturbance; the media outlet B92 reported that he had been badly beaten, and the opposition coalition Zajedno (which included the SPO) indicated he had suffered severe head and chest wounds. His mother was able to visit him in jail and reported that he was being kept in an unheated room and was at risk of developing pneumonia. 

Bulatović's arrest was covered in newspapers such as The New York Times, The Washington Post, and The Guardian.<ref>Julian Borger, "Serb leader rejects way out of political crisis," '"The Guardian, 9 December 1996, p. 2.</ref> His treatment at the hands of state authorities was itself the impetus for new protests against Milošević's government on 9 December; a student group issued the statement, "Must we bow our heads and take all of this? Tomorrow it could be one of us."

Serbian state authorities denied that Bulatović was mistreated and issued a statement saying he "did not have any objections to the way he was treated." Sentenced to twenty-five days in jail, he was released early and took part in further anti-Milošević rallies, including in Belgrade on 31 December. He said that he was again beaten by police on 17 January, after he was recognized in a crowd.

In November 1998, Bulatović's arrest and mistreatment were mentioned in an Amnesty International report on human rights conditions in the Federal Republic of Yugoslavia.

Bulatović remained in Belgrade following the 1996–97 protests. When the Zajedno coalition broke up in late 1997, he took part in further citizen actions in the city. He also left the SPO during the same time and became a member of the Christian Democratic Party of Serbia (Demohrišćanska Stranka Srbije, DHSS).

Slobodan Milošević was defeated in the 2000 Yugoslavian general election and fell from power on 5 October 2000. Bulatović was again arrested and reportedly beaten nine days later by police officers who demanded he inform them about the location of arms taken from the Belgrade police station. He said that he knew nothing about the weapons and that he planned to file charges against the officers. This notwithstanding, he left Serbia for France on 5 November 2000. In a 2002 interview with the SPO's journal Srpska reč, he said that some leaders of the Democratic Opposition of Serbia (Demokratska opozicija Srbije, DOS), the political coalition that overthrew Milošević, had "continued on the same path that Milošević had trodden during his dictatorship." He accused Zoran Đinđić of "privatiz[ing] a mafia-controlled Serbia" and said that "Đinđić's thugs" had beaten him on 15 October 2000. Bulatović has also said that he left Serbia following an encounter with paramilitary commander Milorad Ulemek, also known as Legija. While living in Paris, Bulatović founded the Pokret za novu Srbiju (PZNS).

 Return to Serbia and further political activism 
Bulatović moved back to Serbia on the same day that Legija was arrested. He returned to Šid and founded the Movement for the Protection and Nurturing of the Bosut River, which was among other things focused on an opposition to illegal fishing. In the 2012 Serbian local elections, he was elected as the candidate of his own "Bosut Movement" on the electoral list of the Democratic Party (Demokratska stranka, DS). In 2014, he became deputy president (i.e., deputy speaker) of the assembly. He appeared in the fourth position on another coalition list led by the DS in the 2016 local elections and was re-elected when the list won six mandates.Službeni List (Opštine Šid), Volume 4 Number 8 (25 April 2016), p. 2. Due to an opposition boycott, he was not a candidate for re-election in 2020.

Bulatović joined the ZEP-Zeleni in 2013 and became its leader in 2015. The party participated in the 2016 Vojvodina provincial election on the DS's electoral list, and Bulatović was included in the seventeenth position. The list won only ten mandates and he was not elected.

The ZEP-Zeleni later formed an alliance with the Greens of Serbia (Zeleni Srbije, ZS) known as the United Green Front; this alliance fell apart before the 2017 presidential election, when Bulatović objected to its decision to support Aleksandar Vučić's candidacy. He later brought the ZEP-Zeleni into an association with the Movement of Free Citizens (Pokret slobodnih građana, PSG) and the Citizens' Bloc 381 coalition. This affiliation also proved to be short-lived; he withdrew the party from the 381 coalition in November 2018, citing irreconcilable differences with another party in the movement.

 Vice-President of the Party of Freedom and Justice 
In early 2019, Bulatović led the ZEP-Zeleni into an alliance with Dragan Đilas's political movement; Bulatović permitted his party to be reorganized as the Party of Freedom and Justice (SSP) under Đilas's leadership, which allowed the latter to forgo the process of registering a new party. Bulatović was chosen as a vice-president of the new party.

The SSP contested the 2022 Serbian parliamentary election as part of the United Serbia (Ujedinjena Srbija'', US) coalition, and Bulatović held the eleventh position on the coalition's electoral list. Bulatović was sworn in as MP on 1 August 2022. He left the party in December 2022, shortly after which he claimed that Marinika Tepić allegedly lobbied for the Serbian Progressive Party (SNS). However, Bulatović then met with SNS ministers such as Aleksandar Martinović and Irena Vujović. He agreed to cooperate with Vujović and her ministry of environmental protection. On 28 January 2023, he formed the Alliance of Social Democrats.

References

1975 births
Living people
People from Šid
Christian Democratic Party of Serbia politicians
Green Ecological Party-The Greens politicians
Party of Freedom and Justice politicians
Members of the National Assembly (Serbia)